Hendre is an old Welsh word for an old house or winter farmhouse (also spelt ). The name may refer to:

Places in Wales
 Hendre (Bangor electoral ward), an electoral division in Bangor
 Hendre, Llanddyfnan, an area of Llandyfnan, Anglesey
 Hendre, Llangedwyn, a Site of Special Scientific interest in Clwyd
 The Hendre, a country house in Monmouthshire
 Hendre-Rhys, a small village in Ceredigion
 Hendre Bach, a Site of Special Scientific interest in Clwyd
 Hendre, an area and electoral division in Pencoed, Bridgend
 Hendre Hall, near Penrhyndeudraeth, Gwynedd, Wales

Elsewhere
 Ysgol yr Hendre (Hendre School), Argentina